Brendan Reilly (born 20 August 1969) is an Irish former Gaelic footballer who played for club side St. Peter's, Dunboyne and at inter-county level with the Meath senior football team. He usually lined out as a forward.

Career

Born in Dunboyne, County Meath, Reilly's father, Jim Reilly, was an All-Ireland-winner with Meath in 1954. He first came to prominence at club level with the St. Peter's, Dunboyne club and, in a hugely successful club career, won county championship medals in every adult grade. Reilly was 18-years-old when he made his debut with the Meath senior football team during the National Football League in late 1987 and was a member of the extended panel when Meath beat Cork in the 1988 All-Ireland final. While it took several seasons before he broke onto the senior team on a more permanent basis, he won an All-Ireland Junior Championship title, as well as provincial honours with the Meath under-21 team. Reilly won an All-Ireland medal on the field of play when he scored the winning point in the 1996 All-Ireland Senior Football Championship Final defeat of Mayo. He was an All-Star recipient in 1997, while his other inter-county honours include Leinster Championship and National League titles.

Honours

St. Peter's, Dunboyne
Meath Senior Football Championship: 1998
Meath Intermediate Football Championship: 1992
Meath Junior Football Championship: 1989

Meath
All-Ireland Senior Football Championship: 1988, 1996
Leinster Senior Football Championship: 1988, 1990, 1991, 1996
National Football League: 1987–88, 1989–90, 1993–94
All-Ireland Junior Football Championship: 1988
Leinster Junior Football Championship: 1988
Leinster Under-21 Football Championship: 1989, 1990

Awards
All-Star: 1997

References

External link

 Brendan Reilly profile at the Hogan Stand website

1969 births
Living people
St Peter's Dunboyne Gaelic footballers
Meath inter-county Gaelic footballers